Helena Parente Cunha (born 1929) is a Brazilian educator and writer.

She was born in Salvador, Bahia and received a PhD in Italian literature and literary theory in 1976. Cunha taught literary theory at the Federal University of Rio de Janeiro; at one time, she was the university's Dean of Humanities.

Her 1960 poetry collection Corpo do gozo won the poetry competition of the Secretariat of Education and Culture of  Guanabara.

Selected works 
 Corpo no cerco (Surrounded body), poetry (1978)
 Maramar (Sea love), poetry (1980)
 Os Provisorios (The tentative), short stories (1980)
 Mulher no espelho (Woman between mirrors), novel (1983), received the Prêmio Cruz e Sousa de Literatura
 As doze cores do vermelho (The twelve colours of red), novel (1988)
 Mulheres Inventadas (Invented Women) (1994)
 A casa e as casas (The house and the houses) (1996)

References 

1929 births
Living people
Brazilian women poets
20th-century Brazilian novelists
Brazilian women novelists
Brazilian women short story writers
20th-century Brazilian women writers
20th-century Brazilian short story writers